JLP may refer to:

Organisations 
Jamaica Labour Party, one of the two major political parties in Jamaica
John Lewis Partnership, a British retail company

Individuals 
 Jesse Lee Peterson, American conservative talk show host

Music
 Jagged Little Pill, album by Alanis Morissette

Transport
 Jelapang LRT station (LRT station abbreviation), Singapore

Other 
 Japanese logistics pressurized, one section of the International Space Station's Kibo module